The Donacidae, the "bean clams" or "wedge shells", are a family of bivalve molluscs of the superfamily Tellinoidea. The family is related to the Tellina.

The Donacidae are prolific filter feeders and are an important part of coastal food chains where they occur. The family is sensitive to coastal industry such as dam-building and dredging.

Description
Members of this family have asymmetric, elongated, compressed shells. The two siphons are short but are completely divided, and the foot is large. They are vigorous burrowers.

Genera
Capsella
Capsella variegata
Donax Linnaeus, 1758
Iphigenia Schumacher, 1817
Iphigenia brasiliana (Lamarck, 1818)

References

 
Bivalve families
Taxa named by John Fleming (naturalist)